Metrioptera is a genus of insects in the tribe Platycleidini and subfamily Tettigoniinae, include the bog and meadow bush crickets. They are found in Eurasia.

Species
Species include:
Metrioptera ambigua Pfau, 1986
Metrioptera brachyptera (Linnaeus, 1761)
Metrioptera buyssoni (Saulcy, 1887)
Metrioptera caprai Baccetti, 1956
Metrioptera hoermanni (Werner, 1906)
Metrioptera karnyana Uvarov, 1924
Metrioptera maritima Olmo-Vidal, 1992
Metrioptera prenjica (Burr, 1899)
Metrioptera saussuriana (Frey-Gessner, 1872)
Metrioptera tsirojanni Harz & Pfau, 1983

References

Tettigoniinae
Tettigoniidae genera
Taxonomy articles created by Polbot